Lone Mountain College was a college acquired by the University of San Francisco (USF) in 1978.

History 
It was built and founded by the Religious of the Sacred Heart as Sacred Heart Academy in Menlo Park, California, in 1898. The school became College of the Sacred Heart in 1921. In the 1930s, it moved to San Francisco, California, and became San Francisco College for Women. It was located near the Lone Mountain Cemetery, which was in the process of removal. The school then changed its name again to Lone Mountain College, in 1969, at which time the College began admitting men and became co-educational.   

In 1978, the college was acquired by the University of San Francisco, a private Jesuit university to become USF's Lone Mountain Campus.

References

 http://www.sfgate.com/bayarea/place/article/USF-s-Lone-Mountain-no-longer-a-place-apart-4978866.php

Educational institutions established in 1898
1898 establishments in California
1978 disestablishments in California
Defunct Christian universities and colleges
Defunct private universities and colleges in California
Former women's universities and colleges in the United States
Defunct Catholic universities and colleges in the United States
University of San Francisco
Educational institutions disestablished in 1978